The pelvic floor or pelvic diaphragm is composed of muscle fibers of the levator ani, the coccygeus muscle, and associated connective tissue which span the area underneath the pelvis. The pelvic diaphragm is a muscular partition formed by the levatores ani and coccygei, with which may be included the parietal pelvic fascia on their upper and lower aspects. The pelvic floor separates the pelvic cavity above from the perineal region (including perineum) below. Both males and females have a pelvic floor. To accommodate the birth canal, a female's pelvic cavity is larger than a male's.

Structure
The right and left levator ani lie almost horizontally in the floor of the pelvis, separated by a narrow gap that transmits the urethra, vagina, and anal canal. The levator ani is usually considered in three parts: pubococcygeus, puborectalis, and iliococcygeus. The pubococcygeus, the main part of the levator, runs backward from the body of the pubis toward the coccyx and may be damaged during birth. Some fibers are inserted into the prostate, urethra, and vagina. The right and left puborectalis unite behind the anorectal junction to form a muscular sling. Some regard them as a part of the external anal sphincter. The iliococcygeus, the most posterior part of the levator ani, is often poorly developed.

The coccygeus, situated behind the levator ani and frequently tendinous as much as muscular, extends from the ischial spine to the lateral margin of the sacrum and coccyx.

The pelvic cavity of the true pelvis has the pelvic floor as its inferior border (and the pelvic brim as its superior border).  The perineum has the pelvic floor as its superior border.

Some sources do not consider "pelvic floor" and "pelvic diaphragm" to be identical, with the "diaphragm" consisting of only the levator ani and coccygeus, while the "floor" also includes the perineal membrane and deep perineal pouch. However, other sources include the fascia as part of the diaphragm. In practice, the two terms are often used interchangeably.

Posteriorly, the pelvic floor extends into the anal triangle.

The pelvic floor has two hiatuses (gaps): Anteriorly urogenital hiatus through which urethra and vagina pass through and posteriorly rectal hiatus through which anal canal passes.

Function
It is important in providing support for pelvic viscera (organs), e.g. the bladder, intestines, the uterus (in females), and in maintenance of continence as part of the urinary and anal sphincters. It facilitates birth by resisting the descent of the presenting part, causing the fetus to rotate forwards to navigate through the pelvic girdle. It helps maintain optimal intra-abdominal pressure.

Clinical significance
The pelvic floor is subject to clinically relevant changes that can result in:
 Anterior vaginal wall prolapse
 Cystocele (bladder into vagina)
 Urethrocele (urethra into vagina)
 Cystourethrocele (both bladder and urethra)
 Posterior vaginal wall prolapse
 Enterocele (small intestine into vagina)
 Rectocele (rectum into vagina)
 Apical vaginal prolapse
 Uterine prolapse (uterus into vagina)
 Vaginal vault prolapse (roof of vagina) - after hysterectomy

Pelvic floor dysfunction can result after treatment for gynecological cancers.

Damage to the pelvic floor not only contributes to urinary incontinence but can lead to pelvic organ prolapse.  Pelvic organ prolapse occurs in women when pelvic organs (e.g. the vagina, bladder, rectum, or uterus) protrude into or outside of the vagina.  The causes of pelvic organ prolapse are not unlike those that also contribute to urinary incontinence.  These include inappropriate (asymmetrical, excessive, insufficient) muscle tone and asymmetries caused by trauma to the pelvis.  Age, pregnancy, family history, and hormonal status all contribute to the development of pelvic organ prolapse.  The vagina is suspended by attachments to the perineum, pelvic side wall and sacrum via attachments that include collagen, elastin, and smooth muscle.  Surgery can be performed to repair pelvic floor muscles.  The pelvic floor muscles can be strengthened with Kegel exercises.

Disorders of the posterior pelvic floor include rectal prolapse, rectocele, perineal hernia, and a number of functional disorders including anismus. Constipation due to any of these disorders is called "functional constipation" and is identifiable by clinical diagnostic criteria.

Pelvic floor exercise (PFE), also known as Kegel exercises, may improve the tone and function of the pelvic floor muscles, which is of particular benefit for women (and less commonly men) who experience stress urinary incontinence. However, compliance with PFE programs often is poor, PFE generally is ineffective for urinary incontinence unless performed with biofeedback and trained supervision, and in severe cases it may have no benefit. Pelvic floor muscle tone may be estimated using a perineometer, which measures the pressure within the vagina. Medication may also be used to improve continence. In severe cases, surgery may be used to repair or even to reconstruct the pelvic floor.

Perineology or pelviperineology is a speciality dealing with the functional troubles of the three axes (urological, gynaecological and coloproctological) of the pelvic floor.

Additional images

See also
 Coccyx (tailbone)
 Female genital prolapse
 Pelvic floor dysfunction
 Perineology
 Perineal hernia
 Pubococcygeus muscle
 Vaginal support structures
 Vesicovaginal fistula

References

External links
 Overview at nih.gov

Sexual anatomy
Muscles of the torso
Women's health